{{Speciesbox
| image = Pallavicinia lyellii (veilwort) (20047195578).jpg
| image_caption = 
| genus = Pallavicinia
| species = lyellii
| authority =  (Hook.) Gray
| synonyms = 
 Jungermannia lyellii Hook.
 <small>Pallavicinia lyelii (Hook.) Carruth.</small>
}}Pallavicinia lyellii'', the ribbonwort or veilwort, is a dioicous bryophyte plant in the liverwort family Pallaviciniaceae. Often seen in moist situations on rocks and soil, with a worldwide distribution.

References 

Pallaviciniales
Plants described in 1821
Flora of Australia
Flora of New Zealand
Flora of Germany
Flora of the United States
Flora of Great Britain